Tommy Runar (born 25 April 1982) is a retired Norwegian football goalkeeper. Runar played for Jerv, joining Start in 2004. He spent the majority of the 2008 season on loan at Fredrikstad, serving as cover for Lasse Staw.

He retired after the 2012 season, and has since worked as goalkeeping coach for FK Jerv and Amazon Grimstad.

Career statistics

Honours

Club

Fredrikstad
Tippeligaen:
Runner-up (1): 2008

Personal life
He is member of an Humanity Organisation Start Life Support and founded in Mbale, Uganda, a football camp, along with Kaspar Strømme.

References

1982 births
Living people
People from Grimstad
Norwegian footballers
IK Start players
Fredrikstad FK players
FK Jerv players
Norwegian First Division players
Eliteserien players
Association football goalkeepers
Sportspeople from Agder